The UEFA European Women's Under-19 Championship or simply UEFA Women's Under-19 Championship, is a competition in women's football for European national teams of players under 19 years of age. National under-19 teams whose countries belong to the European governing body UEFA can register to enter the competition.

In odd years the tournament is also a FIFA U-20 Women's World Cup qualifying competition. The tournament began in the 1997–98 season as an under-18 event and became an under-19s event from the 2001–02 season, it is held yearly.  The Championship has 3 phases: the qualifying phase open to all eligible nations, the elite phase featuring the group winners and runners-up from the qualifying phase, and the finals phase which is composed of 8 qualifying teams. The finals themselves are composed of two groups of four teams; each team plays the others in the group. The winner of each group after the 3 matches plays the runner-up of the opposing group in a semi-final, with the winner contesting the final.

Finals format
Since 2002 the finals had eight teams with two groups of four teams, semi-finals and the final.

Results

Winners

Comprehensive team results by tournament (since 2002)

Legend
 – Champions
 – Runners-up
 – Third place
 – Fourth place
 – Semifinals
GS – Group Stage
5th – Fifth place (played in 2005 and 2017)
6th – Sixth place (played in 2005 and 2017)
 – Did not qualify 
 – Did not enter / Withdrew
q – Qualified for upcoming tournament
 — Hosts

For each tournament, the number of teams in each finals tournament (in brackets) are shown.

Since 2002, the 3rd/4th-place match has not been played.

Tournament statistics

Top scorers by tournament

Golden Player by tournament
The official website UEFA.com selected a Golden Player Award for certain tournaments.

See also
FIFA Women's World Cup
FIFA U-20 Women's World Cup
FIFA U-17 Women's World Cup
UEFA Women's Under-17 Championship
UEFA Women's Championship
UEFA Women's Champions League

References

External links  
UEFA – Women's Under-19 homepage
Facts and figures, uefa.com

 
UEFA competitions for women's national teams
Under-19 association football competitions
European youth sports competitions
Recurring sporting events established in 1997
1997 establishments in Europe